Forbes Road is an unincorporated community in Westmoreland County, Pennsylvania, United States. Forbes Road has a post office with ZIP code 15633, which opened on July 1, 1903.

History
Jamison Coal & Coke Company opened a shaft-entry coal mine at Forbes Road in 1900. Known as Jamison No. 3 Mine, its production peaked in 1910, when the facility produced nearly 600,000 tons of coal and employed over 400 people. Jamison ceased operations in Forbes Road in the 1950s. Several buildings and other remains that were part of the mining complex are visible along Hugus Street as of July 2019.

Gallery

References

Unincorporated communities in Westmoreland County, Pennsylvania
Unincorporated communities in Pennsylvania